The 1963 BC Lions finished the season in first place in the Western Conference for the first time ever with a 12–4 record.

Over the course of the season, the Lions' defense allowed an average of only 14.5 points per game while running back Willie Fleming rushed for 1,234 yards and an astounding 9.7 yard average. It was first time the Lions finished with a perfect home record.  A total of seven Lions would make the CFL all-star team and Tom Brown would win the Schenley for Most Outstanding Lineman.

On September 7, a crowd of 36,659 watch the Lions versus the Calgary Stampeders, the largest crowd ever to watch a CFL regular season game at that point in time.

After claiming first place, the Lions earned a bye into the West Finals where they beat the Saskatchewan Roughriders two games to one. They made their first Grey Cup appearance in franchise history, losing to the Hamilton Tiger-Cats by a score of 21–10 at Empire Stadium.

The Lions changed their jerseys.  The orange and black stripes were replaced with thick orange shoulder stripe with TV numbers including within.

Regular season

Season standings

Season schedule

Playoffs

West Finals

 BC wins the best of three series 2–1. The Lions will advance to the Grey Cup Championship game.

Grey Cup

Offensive leaders

Awards and records
 CFL's Most Outstanding Lineman Award – Tom Brown (LB)
 CFL's Coach of the Year – Dave Skrien
 Jeff Nicklin Memorial Trophy – Joe Kapp (QB)

1963 CFL All-Stars
QB – Joe Kapp, CFL All-Star
RB – Willie "The Wisp" Fleming, CFL All-Star
OG – Tom Hinton, CFL All-Star
OT – Lonnie Dennis, CFL All-Star
DE – Dick Fouts, CFL All-Star
LB – Tom Brown, CFL All-Star
LB – Norm Fieldgate, CFL All-Star

References

BC Lions seasons
N. J. Taylor Trophy championship seasons
1963 Canadian Football League season by team
1963 in British Columbia